The Currituck-class seaplane tenders were four ships built for the United States Navy during World War II. The role of a seaplane tender was to provide base facilities for squadrons of seaplanes in a similar way that an aircraft carrier does for its squadrons. While three members of the class were removed from active service in the 1960s, Norton Sound was modified to serve as a testbed for advanced radar and combat management systems, such as the Aegis Combat System.

Design and description

In the interwar period, the United States Navy sought to find a cheaper alternative to the construction of airstrips on land for its air fleet. The distances required for air support, primarily in the Pacific Theater, were long and interwar naval treaties limited the size of aircraft carriers. The seaplane carrier was developed during interwar planning, with two versions being designed for use. The first design, designated AV, operated two full squadrons of patrol aircraft, provided quarters for the aircrew and repair functions. The second, designated AVP, was smaller, only capable of operating one squadron and was intended for use in shallow harbors due to their shallower draft. The Currituck class were of the first design and were also well armed as the ships were expected to provide shore defence too. The primary role of the Currituck class was reconnaissance as their mobility gave them an advantage of land-based aircraft. They also had a secondary role of bombing and torpedo attacks.

As the designs developed, alternative uses for the Currituck class was envisaged, with the United States Marine Corps planning to use them for advanced base operations, flying Marine Corps dive bomber aircraft and another one saw the ships used to transport aircraft to the front lines. Both of these were rejected, with escort carriers considered a more adequate ship type for the second role. During World War II, the Currituck class were used as conventional seaplane tenders.

The lead ship, was powered by Parsons geared turbines, while the three others of the class were given Allis-Chalmers geared turbines. These were powered by steam created by four Babcock & Wilcox Express boilers turning two shafts creating .

The vessels had a wartime complement of 1,247 including 162 officers. During peacetime, the ship's had a complement of 553 including 30 officers. The vessels had a hangar for seaplanes and could operate up to two full squadrons. They also had a flush-decked catapult, that along with a larger hangar, resulted from those alternative uses put forth for the design. During World War II, the vessels were armed with four single-mounted /38-caliber dual-purpose guns, three quad-mounted and four twin-mounted  guns. The 1.6-inch guns were removed postwar.

Ships in class

Construction and career

The lead ship, Currituck, was constructed at the Philadelphia Navy Yard and entered service in 1944. The ship was modernized under the 1957 conversions program at the Philadelphia Naval Shipyard and re-entered service on 20 August 1960. The ship was taken out of service and assigned to the Maritime Administration Reserve Fleet in 1968 after the Martin P5M Marlin aircraft were retired from naval service. Norton Island, Pine Island and Salisbury Sound were all built by Todd Shipyard on the west coast and entered service by mid-1945. In 1948 Norton Island was selected to be converted to a guided missile trials ship. The ship had its two forward 5-inch guns removed and a helicopter platform installed and also had its stern crane removed. Norton Island was assigned to the Operation Test and Evaluation Force. The vessel carried out tests with American versions of the German V-1 flying bomb and the US Navy's Aerobee rocket, the RIM-24 Tartar missile system and the RIM-50 Typhon missile system. Pine Island and Salisbury Sound were placed in reserve in 1967. Currituck, Pine Island and Salisbury Sound were all stricken from the Naval Vessel Register in the 1970s.

See also
List of ship classes of the Second World War

Notes

Citations

References

 
 
 
 
 
 
 
 
 

 
Auxiliary depot ship classes